The 2001 Soul Train Music Awards were held on February 28, 2001 at the Shrine Auditorium in Los Angeles, California. The show was hosted by Queen Latifah, Mýa, and Shemar Moore.

Special awards

Quincy Jones Award for Career Achievement
 The Isley Brothers

Sammy Davis Jr. Award for "Entertainer of the Year" – Male
 Jay Z

Sammy Davis Jr. Award for "Entertainer of the Year" – Female
 Destiny's Child

Winners and nominees
Winners are in bold text.

R&B/Soul or Rap Album of the Year
 Dr. Dre – Dr. Dre 2001
 Eminem – The Marshall Mathers LP
 Jay Z – The Dynasty: Roc La Familia
 R. Kelly – TP-2.com

Best R&B/Soul Album – Male
 R. Kelly – TP-2.com
 D'Angelo – Voodoo
 Sisqó – Unleash the Dragon
 Carl Thomas – Emotional

Best R&B/Soul Album – Female
 Jill Scott – Who Is Jill Scott? Words and Sounds Vol. 1
 Toni Braxton – The Heat
 Mýa – Fear of Flying
 Kelly Price – Mirror Mirror

Best R&B/Soul Album – Group, Band or Duo
 Jagged Edge – J.E. Heartbreak
 Mary Mary – Thankful
 Next – Welcome II Nextasy
 Lucy Pearl – Lucy Pearl

Best R&B/Soul Single – Male
 R. Kelly – "I Wish"
 Avant – "Separated"
 D'Angelo – "Untitled (How Does It Feel)"
 Carl Thomas – "I Wish"

Best R&B/Soul Single – Female
 Yolanda Adams – "Open My Heart"
 Erykah Badu – "Bag Lady"
 Mary J. Blige – "Your Child"
 Jill Scott – "Gettin' In the Way"

Best R&B/Soul Single – Group, Band or Duo
 Jagged Edge – "Let's Get Married"
 Destiny's Child – "Independent Women, Part I"
 Whitney Houston and Deborah Cox – "Same Script, Different Cast"
 Lucy Pearl – "Dance Tonight"

The Michael Jackson Award for Best R&B/Soul or Rap Music Video
 Mystikal – "Shake Ya Ass"
 D'Angelo – "Untitled (How Does It Feel)"
 Eminem – "Stan"
 OutKast – "Ms. Jackson"

Best R&B/Soul or Rap New Artist
 Nelly
 Lil' Bow Wow
 Jill Scott
 Carl Thomas

Best Gospel Album
 Mary Mary – Thankful
 Chester D.T. Baldwin and Music Ministry Mass – Sing It on Sunday Morning!
 Mississippi Mass Choir – Emmanuel (God With Us)
 Lee Williams and the Spiritual QC's – Good Time

Performers
 Destiny's Child – "Survivor"
 Jagged Edge
 Yolanda Adams
 Jay Z and The Dogg Pound – Medley: "I Just Wanna Love U (Give It 2 Me)" / "Change The Game" 
 Mýa
 Mystikal
 Nivea
 Isley Brothers Tribute: Kelly Price – "Groove With You", Sisqo – "Between the Sheets", Gerald Levert – "Voyage to Atlantis" and "Tears"
 Nelly – "Ride wit Me"
 Jill Scott – "A Long Walk"
 Carl Thomas – Medley: "Emotional" / "I Wish"

References

Soul Train Music Awards, 2001
Soul Train Music Awards
Soul
Soul
Soul